A three-wheeler is a vehicle with three wheels. Some are motorized tricycles, which may be legally classed as motorcycles, while others are tricycles without a motor, some of which are human-powered vehicles and animal-powered vehicles.

Overview 
Many three-wheelers which exist in the form of motorcycle-based machines are often called trikes and often have the front single wheel and mechanics similar to that of a motorcycle and the rear axle similar to that of a car. Often such vehicles are owner-constructed using a portion of a rear-engine, rear-drive Volkswagen Beetle in combination with a motorcycle front end. Other trikes include  that are specially constructed for off-road use.

Three-wheelers can have either one wheel at the back and two at the front (2F1R), (for example: Morgan Motor Company) or one wheel at the front and two at the back (1F2R) (such as the Reliant Robin). Due to better safety when braking, an increasingly popular form is the front-steering "tadpole" or "reverse trike" sometimes with front drive but usually with rear drive. A variant on the 'one at the front' layout was the Scott Sociable, which resembled a four-wheeler with a front wheel missing.

Three-wheelers, including some cyclecars, bubble cars and microcars, are built for economic and legal reasons: in the UK for tax advantages, or in the US to take advantage of lower safety regulations, being classed as motorcycles. As a result of their light construction and potential better streamlining, three-wheeled cars are usually less expensive to operate.

Some inexpensive three-wheelers have been designed specifically to improve mobility for disabled people.

Three-wheeler transport vehicles known as auto rickshaws are a common means of public transportation in many countries in the world, and are an essential form of urban transport in many developing countries such as India and the Philippines.

History 
Early automotive pioneer Karl Benz developed a number of three-wheeled models. One of these, the Benz Patent Motorwagen, is regarded as the first purpose-built automobile. It was made in 1885.

In 1896, John Henry Knight showed a tri-car at The Great Exhibition.

In 1897, Edward Butler made the Butler Petrol Cycle, another three-wheeled car.

A Conti 6 hp Tri-car competed in (but did not complete) a 1907 Peking to Paris race sponsored by a French newspaper, Le Matin.

Configurations

Two front 
A configuration of two wheels in the front and one wheel at the back presents two advantages: it has improved aerodynamics, and that it readily enables the use of a small lightweight motorcycle powerplant and rear wheel. This approach was used by the Messerschmitt KR200 and BMW Isetta. Alternatively, a more conventional front-engine, front wheel drive layout as is common in four-wheeled cars can be used, with subsequent advantages for transversal stability (the center of mass is further to the front) and traction (two driven wheels instead of one).  Some vehicles have a front engine driving the single rear wheel, similar to the rear engine driving the rear wheel. The wheel must support acceleration loads as well as lateral forces when in a turn, and loss of traction can be a challenge.

A new tadpole configuration has been proposed  with a rear engine driving the front wheels.  This concept (Dragonfly Three Wheeler) claims both stability and traction (two driven wheels), as well as a unique driving experience.

With two wheels in the front (the "tadpole" form or "reverse trike") the vehicle is far more stable in braking turns, but remains more prone to overturning in normal turns compared to an equivalent four-wheeled vehicle, unless the center of mass is lower and/or further forward. Motorcycle-derived designs suffer from most of the weight being towards the rear of the vehicle.

For lower wind resistance (which increases fuel efficiency), a teardrop shape is often used. A teardrop is wide and round at the front, tapering at the back. The three-wheel configuration allows the two front wheels to create the wide round surface of the vehicle. The single rear wheel allows the vehicle to taper at the back. Examples include the Aptera (solar electric vehicle) and Myers Motors NmG.

Two rear 
Having one wheel in front and two in the rear for power reduces the cost of the steering mechanism but greatly decreases lateral stability when cornering while braking.

When the single wheel is in the front (the "delta" form, as in a child's pedal tricycle), the vehicle is inherently unstable in a braking turn, as the combined tipping forces at the center of mass from turning and braking can rapidly extend beyond the triangle formed by the contact patches of the wheels. This type, if not tipped, also has a greater tendency to spin out ("swap ends") when handled roughly.

Lateral stability 
The disadvantage of a three-wheel configuration is that lateral instability is harder to avoid than with a four wheeled vehicle.

With any vehicle, an imaginary line can be projected from the vehicles centre of mass to the ground, representing the force exerted on the vehicle by its mass. With the vehicle stationary, the line will be vertical. As the vehicle accelerates, that imaginary line tilts backwards, remaining anchored to the centre of mass the point at which the line intersects the ground moves backwards. As you brake it moves forwards, with cornering it moves sidewards. 
Should the point at which this line intersects the ground move outside of the boundary formed by connecting the tyre contact patches together (a rectangle for a four wheeled car, or a triangle for a trike) then the vehicle will tip and eventually fall over. This is true for any vehicle.

With all vehicles it is critical that the vehicle should be engineered to slide before this point of instability is reached.

This can be achieved in several ways:
 by placing the center of mass closer to the ground
 by placing the center of mass closer to the axle with two wheels (for three wheelers)
 by increasing the track width
 by limiting the grip provided by the tyres, such that the vehicle loses adhesion before it starts to tip.
 By tilting some or all of the vehicle as it corners.

In the case of a three-wheeled ATV, tipping may be avoided by the rider leaning into turns.

Tilting option 

To improve stability some three-wheelers are designed to tilt while cornering like a motorcyclist would do. The tilt may be controlled manually, mechanically or by computer.

A tilting three-wheeler's body or wheels, or both, tilt in the direction of the turn. Such vehicles can corner safely even with a narrow track.

Some tilting three-wheelers could be considered to be forms of feet forwards motorcycles or cabin motorcycles or both.

Electric three wheelers

Battery-powered three wheelers 

Three-wheeled battery powered designs include:
 Aptera (solar electric vehicle)
 Arcimoto
 CityEl
 Commuter Cars Tango
 Cree SAM
 ElectraMeccanica SOLO
 Myers Motors NmG (formerly Corbin Sparrow)
 Nobe GT100
 Toyota i-Road
 Triac
 Vanderhall Edison 2
 ZAP Xebra
EWheels EW 36(mobility scooter)

Solar-powered three wheelers 

Here are three notable examples of solar-powered three wheelers; two race cars, the Infinium and the Sky Ace TIGA, and a vehicle planned for production, the Aptera.

The Infinium, built by the University of Michigan Solar Car Team, came in 3rd place in the 2009 World Solar Challenge held in Australia, and won the 2010 American Solar Challenge.

Ashiya University's Sky Ace TIGA achieved  at Shimojishima Airport, in Miyakojima, Okinawa, Japan, to win the Guinness World Record, on 20 August 2014. It took the record from another three-wheeler, Sunswift IV, designed and built at the University of New South Wales in Australia, by a margin of almost 

The Aptera solar electric vehicle  uses a tadpole layout and is being designed to have a top speed of over 100 mph. The Aptera uses 42 KW in-wheel electric motors and can be ordered with two (front-wheel drive) or three (all-wheel drive) motors. The Aptera's roof and dashboard, and optionally its hood and hatch, are fitted with solar panels, with the full compliment being designed to add a range of up to 40 miles per day and 11,000 miles per year in the sunniest climates. First customer availability is planned for before the end of 2024.

Steam-powered three wheelers 

The world's first full-size self-propelled land vehicle was a three-wheeler. French Army Captain Nicolas-Joseph Cugnot's 1770 fardier à vapeur (steam dray), a steam tricycle with a top speed of around 3 km/h (2 mph), was intended for hauling artillery.

Another of the earliest preserved examples is the Long steam tricycle, built by George A. Long around 1880 and patented in 1883, now on display at the Smithsonian Institution.

Wind-powered three wheelers 
The Whike is a recumbent tricycle with a sail, made in the Netherlands.

All-terrain vehicles 

Due to the incidence of injuries related to their use, a 10-year ban, entirely voluntary for manufacturers, was placed on the sale of new three-wheeled all-terrain vehicles in the United States in January 1988. More injuries were sustained by riders by not applying a proper riding technique, and lack of wearing proper safety gear such as helmets and riding boots. In a search conducted by the Consumer Product Safety Commission, it was determined that "no inherent flaw was found in the three wheel design".

Registration 

In the U.S, the National Highway Traffic Safety Administration defines and regulates three-wheeled vehicles as motorcycles.
However, in 2015 a bill was introduced in Congress that would prevent some three wheeled vehicles from being classified as motorcycles in the United States, instead creating a new classification for "autocycles".

Driver's license and registration requirements vary on a state-by-state basis.  Some states require drivers of three wheeled vehicles to have a motorcycle license and register the vehicle as a motorcycle. Some states, including Virginia, Kansas, and Indiana, classify some three wheeled vehicles as autocycles.  Virginia defines an autocycle as "a three-wheeled motor vehicle that has a steering wheel and seating that does not require the operator to straddle or sit astride and is manufactured to comply with federal safety requirements for motorcycles." Indiana defines it as "a three (3) wheeled motor vehicle in which the operator and passenger ride in a completely or partially enclosed seating area that is equipped with:(1) a rollcage or roll hoops; (2) safety belts for each occupant; and (3) antilock brakes;and is designed to be controlled with a steering wheel and pedals." In other jurisdictions, such as British Columbia, Canada, and Connecticut, a three-wheeled vehicle with an enclosed passenger compartment or partially enclosed seat is considered an automobile.

Examples

Two front wheels

Two rear wheels

References

External links 
 Complete A-Z list of three-wheelers since 1940

Wheeled vehicles

de:Dreirad#Threewheeler und Kabinenroller